Masumabad, also rendered as Mazumabad, is the name of a geographic location often found in Iran, and may refer to:

Fars Province 
Masumabad, Marvdasht, a village in Fars Province, Iran
Masumabad, Dorudzan, a village in Marvdasht County, Fars Province

Golestan Province 
Masumabad, Azadshahr, a village in Golestan Province, Iran
Masumabad, Gorgan, Golestan Province
Masumabad-e Fenderesk, Golestan Province

Isfahan Province 
Masumabad, Buin va Miandasht, a village in Isfahan Province
Masumabad, Nain, a village in Isfahan Province

Mazandaran Province 
Masumabad, Amol, Mazandaran Province
Masumabad, Nur, Mazandaran Province

South Khorasan Province 
Masumabad, Khusf, South Khorasan Province
Masumabad, Zirkuh, South Khorasan Province

Other provinces 
 Masumabad, Ardabil, a village in Ardabil Province, Iran
 Masumabad, Kurdistan, a village in Kurdistan Province, Iran
 Masumabad, Lorestan, a village in Lorestan Province, Iran
 Masumabad, Qom, a village in Qom Province, Iran
 Masumabad, Razavi Khorasan, a village in Razavi Khorasan Province, Iran
 Masumabad, Semnan, a village in Semnan Province, Iran

See also 
 Masuma (disambiguation), a disambiguation page